Kuala Lumpur Bird Park is a  public aviary in Kuala Lumpur, Malaysia. It is located adjacent to the Lake Gardens within a KL green lung in Bukit Aman, close to the National Mosque and Royal Malaysian Police Museum. The Bird Park houses more than 3,000 birds representing more than 200 species in an enclosed aviary. About 90% are local birds and 10% were imported from countries such as Australia, China, Holland, Indonesia, New Guinea, Tanzania and Thailand.

The bird park is part of the  Lake Gardens, which were established in 1888. In addition to the  bird park, which was created in 1991, the gardens include an artificial lake, the National Monument, the Kuala Lumpur Butterfly Park, the Deer Park, Orchid and Hibiscus gardens, and the former Malaysia Parliament House. It is one of the world's largest covered bird parks.

Transportation
The park is served by the following bus routes

Intrakota Bus 21C, 48C (From Kota Raya).
Intrakota Bus 18, 21A (From Chow Kit).
RapidKL Bus 115 (From KL Sentral).

Image gallery

See also

National Zoo of Malaysia (Zoo Negara)

Notes

External links

Aviaries in Malaysia
Buildings and structures in Kuala Lumpur
Bird parks
Tourist attractions in Kuala Lumpur
Zoos established in 1991